VHF radio can refer to several communications services in the very high frequency (VHF) range, including:

 Airband aircraft radio
 Amateur radio in the 6-, 2- and 1-1/4-meter bands
 FM radio broadcasts
 Marine VHF radio